Sally Hayden is an Irish journalist and writer. A foreign correspondent, she has reported from Sudan, Ethiopia, Uganda and Rwanda. Her book My Fourth Time, We Drowned, an investigation into the migrant crisis, was published in 2022 and awarded The Orwell Prize for Political Writing 2022, the 2022 Michel Déon Prize, and is the Overall Book of the Year at the 2022 Irish Book Awards.

Early life
Hayden obtained a Bachelor of Civil Law degree from University College Dublin in 2012.
Hayden also holds a Masters degree in International Relations from Trinity College Dublin.

Career
Hayden has written for The BBC, TIME, The Guardian, Newsweek, The Washington Post, Al Jazeera, CNN International, NBC News, Channel 4 News, The New York Times, Thomson Reuters Foundation News, Magnum Photos, The Irish Times, The Financial Times, The Daily Telegraph, RTÉ. In 2014, she was staff writer with VICE News.

In 2020, she was awarded the UCD Alumni Award in Law.

My Fourth Time, We Drowned
Hayden's first book depicts the struggle for African migrants and refugees to get to Europe. It was named the Irish Book Awards non-fiction, and overall, book of the year in 2022, and was shortlisted for the 2022 Baillie Gifford Prize.

For International Migrants Day 2022, Kim Yi-Dionne and Laura Seay of The Washington Post named the book among the top three new books to read on the topic.

References

External links

Journalists from Dublin (city)
Irish war correspondents
Alumni of University College Dublin
1989 births
Living people
21st-century Irish non-fiction writers
21st-century Irish women writers